The Battle of Mamora was a military engagement between the Wattasid Morrocans and the Portuguese army who landed in Mamora, the Wattasids were victorious, and the Portuguese were decisively defeated.

in 1515, Manuel I of Portugal Sent an armada consisting of 8000 men and 200 ships, led by D. António de Noronha, Count of Linhares, with a task of capturing and building a fort in  Mehdya, naming it Sao Joao da Mamora, arriving there, the low tide and shifting sandbars left the Portuguese ships stranded, seeing their opportunity, the Moroccans led by sultan Muhammad al-Burtuqali attacked the Portuguese with an army of three thousand cavalry and thirty thousand infantry, Portuguese casualties were heavy, 4000 were killed and 100 ships were lost.

it was a decisive victory for Wattasids, it shattered Manuel's and Portuguese hopes to conquer entire Morocco.

Notes

 not to be confused with António de Noronha, the 25th Viceroy of Portuguese India.

References 

Battles involving Morocco
Battles involving Portugal
16th century in Morocco
Morocco–Portugal military relations